Start the Machine is the eighth album by California stoner rock band Fu Manchu. This is the first studio album featuring new drummer Scott Reeder (not to be confused with Scott Reeder of Kyuss fame) in the place of Brant Bjork.

Track listing

Personnel
Scott Hill – lead vocals, guitar
Bob Balch – guitar, backing vocals
Brad Davis – bass, theremin, backing vocals
Scott Reeder – drums, backing vocals

Production
Brian Joseph Dobbs – producer, engineer, mixing
Danielle Burns – digital editing
David Paul Jr. Collins – mastering
Carl Saff – remastering

References

2004 albums
Fu Manchu (band) albums
DRT Entertainment albums